Sir Nilesh Jayantilal Samani  (born 19 July 1956) is a British physician who is professor of Cardiology at the University of Leicester, consultant cardiologist at Glenfield Hospital in the city, and Medical Director of the British Heart Foundation.

Life and Career
Samani is of ethnic Indian origin and was born in Nanyuki, Kenya.  His mother tongue is Gujarati. He was educated at the Lenana School in Nairobi and once his family moved to the UK in 1971, at Charles Keene College in Leicester, and then studied medicine at the University of Leicester. Serving as a house officer from 1981 and then as a senior house officer from 1982 to 1985, Samani then became an MRC Clinical Trainee Fellow until 1988. From that point, he served as a lecturer in medicine, then senior lecturer from 1993 onwards co-terminous with his appointment as a consultant at Glenfield until his elevation to Professor in 1997.

Samani achieved his MD and Fellowship of the Royal College of Physicians (FRCP) in 1994, and of the Academy of Medical Sciences (FMedSci) in 2002. Since 2010 he has served as a Deputy Lieutenant of Leicestershire. He was knighted in the 2015 New Year Honours for "services to Medicine and Medical Research".

In February 2023, the British Heart Foundation announced that Samani would step down as Medical Director some time after September of the same year, after 7 years in the post.

Personal Life
He is married with two sons.

References 

1956 births
British cardiologists
Knights Bachelor
Deputy Lieutenants of Leicestershire
NIHR Senior Investigators
Living people
Kenyan emigrants to the United Kingdom
British people of Indian descent
Kenyan people of Asian descent